Denali Park, formerly McKinley Park, is a census-designated place (CDP) in Denali Borough, in the U.S. state of Alaska.  As of the 2020 census, the population of the CDP was 163, down from 185 at the 2010 census.

Geography 

Denali Park is located at  (63.651444, -148.822322). It is in the valley of the Nenana River along the eastern edge of Denali National Park and Preserve. The park's main visitor center is located along the main road into the park, just to the west of the CDP's limits.

Climate 
Denali Park has a subarctic climate (Dfc) like most of Alaska. Summer days are mild with nights being brisk. Winters are severely cold with extremely heavy annual snowfall averaging . Most of Denali Park's precipitation occurs during the months of June - September.

Demographics

Denali Park, then known as McKinley Park, first reported on the 1930 U.S. Census as an unincorporated village. It continued to report until 1960. It did not report in 1970. It has returned in every census since 1980, when it was made a census-designated place (CDP). With the restoration of the name of Mount McKinley to Denali made official in 2015, McKinley Park's name was changed to Denali Park.

As of the census of 2000, there were 142 people, 72 households, and 31 families residing in the CDP. The population density was 0.8 people per square mile (0.3/km2). The racial makeup of the CDP was 92.96% White, 0.70% Native American, 2.82% from other races, and 3.52% from two or more races. Hispanic or Latino of any race were 1.41% of the population.

There were 72 households, out of which 15.3% had children under the age of 18 living with them, 40.3% were married couples living together, 2.8% had a female householder with no husband present, and 55.6% were non-families. 41.7% of all households were made up of individuals, and 1.4% had someone living alone who was 65 years of age or older.  The average household size was 1.97 and the average family size was 2.78.

In the CDP, the population was spread out, with 16.9% under the age of 18, 3.5% from 18 to 24, 43.0% from 25 to 44, 33.1% from 45 to 64, and 3.5% who were 65 years of age or older.  The median age was 41 years.  For every 100 females, there were 153.6 males.  For every 100 females age 18 and over, there were 145.8 males.

The median income for a household in the CDP was $53,750, and the median income for a family was $64,583. Males had a median income of $56,250 versus $31,250 for females. The per capita income for the CDP was $27,255.  About 8.6% of families and 11.5% of the population and 8.6% of families were below the poverty line, including 32.0% of those under the age of 18 and none of those 65 and older.

References

Census-designated places in Denali Borough, Alaska
Census-designated places in Alaska